Sea World, Seaworld, SeaWorld may mean:

 Sea World (Australia), a marine theme park in Main Beach, Gold Coast, Australia
 Sea World (Shenzhen), a tourist attraction in Shenzhen, China
 Sea World Jakarta, a marine aquarium situated in North Jakarta, Indonesia
 SeaWorld, a U.S. chain of marine theme parks
 SeaWorld Abu Dhabi
 SeaWorld Ohio
 SeaWorld Orlando
 SeaWorld San Antonio
 SeaWorld San Diego
 63 Seaworld, a Korean aquarium
 Deep Sea World, a Scottish aquarium
 Kamogawa Sea World (:ja:鴨川シーワールド), a marine theme park in Japan

See also
 Marine World (disambiguation)
 Marineland (disambiguation)
 Water planet (disambiguation)
 Water World (disambiguation)